The 2000 United States presidential election in Alaska took place on November 7, 2000, and was part of the 2000 United States presidential election. Voters chose 3 representatives, or electors to the Electoral College, who voted for president and vice president.

Alaska was won by Governor George W. Bush by a 31.0% margin of victory. Green Party nominee Ralph Nader had his best performance here in 2000, obtaining over 10% of the vote. Al Gore received 28% of the vote. This is the most recent election in which Juneau, Sitka, Skagway, and Hoonah–Angoon Census Area voted for the Republican candidate. This is the only time the latter borough voted Republican in the state's history.

Results

Boroughs and census areas that flipped from Democratic to Republican 
Aleutians West {largest town: Unalaska)
Dillingham
Juneau
Lake and Peninsula (largest town: Port Alsworth)
Nome
Northwest Arctic {largest town: Kotzebue)
Skagway
Hoonah–Angoon Census Area (largest town: Hoonah)
Kusilvak {largest town: Hooper Bay)
Yakutat
Yukon-Koyukuk {largest town: Fort Yukon)

By congressional district
Due to the state's low population, only one congressional district is allocated. This district, called the at-large district, because it covers the entire state, and thus is equivalent to the statewide election results.

Electors 

Technically the voters of Alaska cast their ballots for electors: representatives to the Electoral College. Alaska is allocated 3 electors because it has 1 congressional districts and 2 senators. All candidates who appear on the ballot or qualify to receive write-in votes must submit a list of 3 electors, who pledge to vote for their candidate and his or her running mate. Whoever wins the majority of votes in the state is awarded all 3 electoral votes. Their chosen electors then vote for president and vice president. Although electors are pledged to their candidate and running mate, they are not obligated to vote for them. An elector who votes for someone other than his or her candidate is known as a faithless elector.

The electors of each state and the District of Columbia met on December 18, 2000, to cast their votes for president and vice president. The Electoral College itself never meets as one body. Instead the electors from each state and the District of Columbia met in their respective capitols.

The following were the members of the Electoral College from the state. All were pledged to and voted for George W. Bush and Dick Cheney:
Bill Allen
Susan Fischetti
Lucy Groh

See also
United States presidential elections in Alaska

References

President
Alaska
2000